The 1988 French Figure Skating Championships took place in Grenoble for singles and pairs and in Lyon for ice dance. Skaters competed in the disciplines of men's singles, women's singles, pair skating, and ice dancing on the senior level. The event was used to help determine the French team to the 1988 Winter Olympics, the 1988 World Championships, and the 1988 European Championships.

Results

Men

Ladies

Pairs

Ice dance

External links
 French article

1987 in figure skating
French Figure Skating Championships, 1988
French Figure Skating Championships
1988 in French sport